Malacoctenus hubbsi, the redside blenny, is a species of labrisomid blenny native to the Gulf of California extending to the Pacific coast of southern Baja California. This species can reach a length of  TL. The specific name honours the American ichthyologist Clark Hubbs (1921-2008).

References

External links
 

hubbsi
Fish of the Gulf of California
Fish of Mexican Pacific coast
Fish described in 1959
Taxa named by Victor G. Springer